Pablo Cuevas and Pere Riba are the defending champions, but chose not to participate.

Seeds

Draw

References
 Main Draw

Seguros Bolivar Open Barranquilla - Doubles
2014 Doubles